Rhaptopetalum sindarense is a species of plant in the family Lecythidaceae. It is endemic to Gabon.

References

sndarense
Vulnerable plants
Endemic flora of Gabon
Taxonomy articles created by Polbot